Pierrepont is the name or part of the name of several communes in France:

Pierrepont, Aisne, in the Aisne département 
Pierrepont, Calvados, in the Calvados département 
Pierrepont, Meurthe-et-Moselle, in the Meurthe-et-Moselle département
Pierrepont-sur-Avre, in the Somme département 
Pierrepont-sur-l'Arentèle, in the Vosges département

See also
Pierrepont, New York - town and Hamlet in New York
Holme Pierrepont - village in Nottinghamshire, UK
Henry Pierrepont (politician) (1546–1615) - Landowner and MP
Robert Pierrepont, 1st Earl of Kingston-upon-Hull (1584–1643) - Royalist soldier
Henry Pierrepont, 2nd Earl of Kingston-upon-Hull (1607–1680) - MP and Privy Counsellor
Francis Pierrepont (Parliamentarian) (died 1659) - Parliamentarian soldier and MP
Robert Pierrepont, 3rd Earl of Kingston-upon-Hull (1660–1682) - 
William Pierrepont, 4th Earl of Kingston-upon-Hull (1662–1690) - 
Evelyn Pierrepont, 1st Duke of Kingston-upon-Hull (c.1655–1726) - MP
Evelyn Pierrepont, 2nd Duke of Kingston-upon-Hull (1711–1773) - 
Charles Pierrepont, 1st Earl Manvers (1737–1816) - Naval Officer
Charles Herbert Pierrepont, 2nd Earl Manvers (1778–1860) 
Sydney William Herbert Pierrepont, 3rd Earl Manvers (1825–1900)
Charles William Sydney Pierrepont, 4th Earl Manvers (1854–1926)
Henry Pierrepont (diplomat) (1780–1851) - Envoy to the Court of Sweden.
Pierrepoint (disambiguation)